Project Clear Vision was a covert examination of Soviet-made biological bomblets conducted by the Battelle Memorial Institute under contract with the CIA. The legality of this project under the Biological Weapons Convention (BWC) of 1972 is disputed.

History

The operation
Project Clear Vision was conducted between 1997 and 2000, during the Clinton Administration.  The project's stated goal was to assess the efficacy of bio-agent dissemination from bomblets. The program received criticism due to suspicions that its findings could possibly be used in a covert US bioweapons program.

Reportage
The secret project was disclosed in a September 2001 article in The New York Times. Reporters Judith Miller, Stephen Engelberg and William J. Broad collaborated to write the article.  Shortly after the article appeared, the authors published a book that further elaborated the story. The 2001 book, Germs: Biological Weapons and America's Secret War, and the article are the only publicly available sources concerning Project Clear Vision and its sister projects, Bacchus and Jefferson.

Legality
As signatory to the BWC, the United States is committed to refrain from development of bioweapons. Moreover,
the US did not disclose the secret project in its annual confidence-building measure (CBM) declarations. The US maintains that the program was fully consistent with the BWC because the project was defensive in nature.

References

Further reading
Miller, Judith, Engelberg, Stephen and Broad, William J. Germs: Biological Weapons and America's Secret War, (Google Books), Simon and Schuster, 2002,.

Arms control
United States biological weapons program
Military projects of the United States